Cecilie Maria Stenspil (born 22 October 1979) is a Danish actress. She graduated from the School of Acting at Odense Teater in 2006.

She has had leading roles in a large number of performances at several Danish theaters, including the Royal Danish Theatre, Aarhus Theater, Odense Teater and at the Folketeateret and she has starred in several films and TV series. In addition, she has voiced a huge number of cartoon productions.

Career
As a child, Stenspil was a student at the children's theater Eventyrteatret for 5 years. Since she was 10 years old, she has voiced various cartoons and cartoon series. In addition, she has recorded a number of audio books, including Lene Kaaberbøl's Skyggeporten.

In 2009, she made her debut in front of the camera as Jasmina El-Murad in The Protectors.

She plays Mrs. Helene Aurland in all the episodes of Badehotellet on TV 2.

Cecilie Stenspil received the Ove Sprogøe Prize of DKK 30,000 on 21 December 2010, on Ove Sprogøe's 91st birthday. In addition to the mentioned award, she has received Poul Reumert's honorary scholarship, Prince Henrik's scholarship and Tagea Brandt's travel scholarship.

In 2017, she participated in Peter Langdal's Efter brylluppet together with Kasper Leisner and Barbara Moleko.

Personal life
Stenspil is the daughter of the educator Lisbeth Stenspil and Børge Krogh Samuelsen. She is the older sister of Simon Stenspil and is half Faroese.

Since 2013, Stenspil is the life partner of fellow actor Troels Lyby. They have two children together born in August 2018 and again in 2020.

Theater 
 2016 Aarhus Theater: Fornuft og følelse – Marianne Dashwood
 2013 Royal Danish Theatre, Ulvedalene: Robin Hood – Lady Marian
 2013 Forum Copenhagen: Hey Jude Teaterkoncert
 2012 Folketeatret: Bang og Betty – Betty Nansen 
 2012 Grønnegårds Teatret: Educating Rita – Rita Susan White
 2012 Nørrebros Theater: Next to Normal – Diana Goodman
 2011 Royal Danish Theatre: Mågen – Nina
 2010 Royal Danish Theatre: My Fair Lady – Eliza Doolittle
 2009 Odense Teater: Breaking the Waves – Bess 
 2007 Odense Teater: Guitaristerne – Kim 
 2007 Odense Teater: The Wonderful Wizard of Oz – Dorothy 
 2007 Odense Teater: Peter Pan – Wendy 
 2006 Odense Teater: Erasmus Montanus – Lisbed
 2006 Odense Teater: A Christmas Carol – Bella

Filmography

Film

TV series

Video games

References

External links
 

1979 births
Living people
People from Glostrup Municipality
Danish film actresses
Danish stage actresses
Danish television actresses
Danish video game actresses
Danish voice actresses
Danish people of Faroese descent
21st-century Danish actresses